Besenyszög is a town in Jász-Nagykun-Szolnok county, in the Northern Great Plain region of central Hungary.

Geography

International relations
Besenyszög is twinned with:

 Weidenbach, Germany; since 2014

References

External links

  in Hungarian

Populated places in Jász-Nagykun-Szolnok County